Superwoman is a fictional character.

Superwoman may also refer to:

"Superwoman (Where Were You When I Needed You)", a 1972 song by Stevie Wonder
"Superwoman" (Karyn White song), a 1988 song by Karyn White
"Superwoman Pt. II", a 2001 single by Lil' Mo featuring Fabolous
"Supawoman", a 2007 single by Kimberley Locke
Superwoman (Paulini album), 2006 album by Paulini
Superwoman (Rebecca Ferguson album), 2016 album by Rebecca Ferguson
"Superwoman" (Alicia Keys song), a 2008 single by Alicia Keys
"Superwoman" (Shontelle song) a 2008 song by Shontelle
Superwoman (sociology), a woman striving to excel in multiple roles
"Superwoman", a song by Meghan Trainor from her 2022 album, Takin' It Back
"Superwoman", a song by Mumzy Stranger from the 2010 album, Journey Begins
Lilly Singh, a Canadian YouTube personality who formerly posted under the alias of IISuperwomanII